The 1996–97 Ranji Trophy was the 63rd season of the Ranji Trophy. Bombay won the final against Delhi on first innings lead. This match, held at Gwalior, was the first day-night first class match in India.

Raman Lamba who scored 1034 and Ajay Sharma, 1033, bettered the previous record for most runs in a season.

Knockout Matches

Quarterfinal 1

Quarterfinal 2

Semifinal 1

Semifinal 2

Final

Scorecards and averages
Cricketarchive

References

External links

1997 in Indian cricket
Ranji Trophy seasons
Domestic cricket competitions in 1996–97